Frances Helen Dafoe,  (December 17, 1929 – September 23, 2016) was a Canadian pair skater. She was born in Toronto, Ontario. She competed with Norris Bowden. The couple captured four Canadian titles and two World Figure Skating Championships, and won the silver medal at the 1956 Winter Olympics.

Following her skating career, Dafoe worked as an Olympic judge and costume designer. She worked for CBC for nearly 40 years designing costumes for various shows, and she also designed the performers' costumes for the closing ceremonies at the 1988 Winter Olympics.

In 1991, she was made a Member of the Order of Canada. Dafoe died on September 23, 2016 at the age of 86.

Results

References

1929 births
2016 deaths
Canadian female pair skaters
Figure skaters at the 1952 Winter Olympics
Figure skaters at the 1956 Winter Olympics
Members of the Order of Canada
Members of the Order of Ontario
Olympic figure skaters of Canada
Olympic silver medalists for Canada
Figure skaters from Toronto
Olympic medalists in figure skating
World Figure Skating Championships medalists
Medalists at the 1956 Winter Olympics